Semyon Ivanovich Rzhishchin (15 February 1933 - 27 December 1986) was a Soviet athlete who competed mainly in the 3000 metre steeple chase. He was born in Ryazan Oblast and trained in Moscow at the Armed Forces sports society.

On August 14, 1956, competing in the first Spartakiad of the Peoples of the USSR, he broke the World Record in the 3000 metre steeple chase. He competed for the USSR in the 1960 Summer Olympics held in Rome, Italy in the 3000 metre steeple chase where he won the bronze medal.

References

1933 births
1986 deaths
Soviet male long-distance runners
Soviet male steeplechase runners
Olympic bronze medalists for the Soviet Union
Athletes (track and field) at the 1956 Summer Olympics
Athletes (track and field) at the 1960 Summer Olympics
Olympic athletes of the Soviet Union
Armed Forces sports society athletes
World record setters in athletics (track and field)
European Athletics Championships medalists
Sportspeople from Ryazan Oblast
Medalists at the 1960 Summer Olympics
Olympic bronze medalists in athletics (track and field)